Txomin Nagore Arbizu (Domingo in Spanish; born 26 August 1974) is a Spanish former professional footballer who played as a defensive midfielder.

He amassed La Liga totals of 168 matches and four goals over eight seasons, representing Athletic Bilbao, Numancia, Atlético Madrid and Mallorca. Starting out at Osasuna, he added 361 appearances in Segunda División, mainly with Numancia.

Club career
Nagore was born in Irurtzun, Navarre. A product of CA Osasuna's youth system, he made his La Liga debut with Athletic Bilbao, playing 17 La Liga games in the club's 1997–98 runner-up league campaign; he first appeared in the competition on 6 September 1997, starting in a 1–1 away draw against Real Betis.

Nagore went on to represent CD Numancia, Atlético Madrid– playing a career-best 40 matches in the 2001–02 season as the Colchoneros returned to the top flight, while adding three goals– RCD Mallorca, RC Celta de Vigo and Levante UD, always being a regularly used defensive unit albeit in few starts.

In summer 2006, Nagore returned to Numancia, being a key element in the side's top-tier return in his second year. In the following season he was also regularly played, but the Sorians were immediately relegated.

On 9 May 2013, Nagore featured the full 90 minutes against Córdoba CF (1–0 home win) for his 500th game as a professional. In the off-season, after a further 234 official appearances for Numancia, the 39-year-old signed with fellow league club CD Mirandés.

Personal life
Nagore's older brother, Jorge (born 1971), played Basque pelota.

Honours
Atlético Madrid
Segunda División: 2001–02

Numancia
Segunda División: 2007–08

References

External links

Celta de Vigo biography 

1974 births
Living people
People from Barranca (comarca)
Spanish footballers
Footballers from Navarre
Association football midfielders
La Liga players
Segunda División players
Segunda División B players
Tercera División players
CA Osasuna B players
CA Osasuna players
Athletic Bilbao footballers
CD Numancia players
Atlético Madrid footballers
RCD Mallorca players
RC Celta de Vigo players
Levante UD footballers
CD Mirandés footballers
Basque Country international footballers